Daniel Grubesic (born 1 October 1995) is an Austrian footballer who plays for USV Mettersdorf.

External links
 
 

Austrian footballers
Kapfenberger SV players
2. Liga (Austria) players
1995 births
Living people
Association football defenders
People from Bruck an der Mur
Footballers from Styria